Communist Vietnam may refer to:
Democratic Republic of Vietnam, also known as "North Vietnam"
Provisional Revolutionary Government of the Republic of South Vietnam, South Vietnamese government after the Fall of Saigon
Socialist Republic of Vietnam, also known commonly as "Vietnam"
Communist Party of Vietnam
Viet Cong